The Heuliez Raffica (Raffica means "flurry" in Italian) is a two-seater convertible with an electronically controlled retractable hardtop that was unveiled at the 1992 Paris Motor Show.

Overview
It was designed by Marc Deschamps with aerodynamics in mind. A second version, with four seats, was built after the original.

References

Concept cars